Barnesville High School is a public high school in Barnesville, Ohio.  It is the only high school in the Barnesville Exempted Village School District. Athletic teams compete as the Barnesville Shamrocks in the Ohio High School Athletic Association as a member of the Ohio Valley Athletic Conference.

History
The high school was first opened in 1874 in downtown Barnesville, and the first class graduated in 1877. The school district began to feel growing pains in the 1940s and a measure was passed to build a new high school. A site was selected on the east end of Barnesville and groundbreaking commenced in the 1960s. The building later saw renovations in the early 2000s due to the growing student body. The work included an expanded gymnasium, an administration wing, enlarged art room and an industrial arts room, as well as some technological and decorative upgrades.

Athletics
The following is an alphabetical list of sports offered by the high school.
Baseball
Basketball
Cross Country
Football
Golf
Softball
Swimming
Track and Field
Volleyball
Wrestling

OHSAA State Championships

 Boys Track and Field – 1978
 Boys Wrestling – 1984
 Girls Cross Country – 1997

Extracurriculars
Band
Cheerleading
National Honor Society
Key Club
Student Athletic Association
Varsity B
FOCA
FEA
FFA
Art Club
Senrab

Notes and references

External links
 District Website

High schools in Belmont County, Ohio
Public high schools in Ohio
1874 establishments in Ohio